This is a list of lakes in Papua New Guinea. There are about 5383 freshwater lakes in the country.

Lakes

Volcanic crater lakes

Dams

See also

References

External links

Papua New Guinea
Lakes